Prateek Bhushan Singh (born 9 May 1988) is an Indian politician. Prateek Bhushan Singh is son of Mr. Brij Bhushan Saran Singh, M.P. from Kaiserganj constituency, Tarabganj, Gonda uttar pradesh. He is a member of the Legislative Assembly of Uttar Pradesh representing Gonda.

References

Uttar Pradesh MLAs 2017–2022
Bharatiya Janata Party politicians from Uttar Pradesh
Living people
People from Gonda, Uttar Pradesh
1988 births
Uttar Pradesh MLAs 2022–2027